
Sasbahu Temple, also called the Sas-Bahu Mandir, Sas-Bahu Temples, Sahasrabahu Temple or Harisadanam temple, is an 11th-century twin temple in Gwalior, Madhya Pradesh, India. Near the Gwalior Fort and dedicated to Vishnu in his Padmanabha form, like most Hindu and Jain temples in this region, it is mostly in ruins and was badly damaged from numerous invasions and Hindu-Muslim wars in the region. It was built in 1093 by King Mahipala of the Kachchhapaghata dynasty, according to an inscription found in the larger of the twin temple. The twin temples are situated in the Gwalior Fort.

The temple's tower and sanctum has been destroyed, but its architecture and damaged carvings can still be appreciated from the ruins. The temple was three-storeyed, which was one of its distinguishing features and sophistication. It followed a central cluster concept, states Adam Hardy. The surviving elements of the temple are the entrance porch and the mandapa. According to James Harle, though the prasada (tower, spire) no longer exists, the triple storey plan with a cruciform foundation and balconies suggests that it had a North Indian Bhumija style architecture. This style, states Harle, is marked by a well proportioned superstructure, its "regularly arranged little subordinate sikharas strung out like gigantic beaded garlands".

This temple mainly has three entrances from three different directions. In the fourth direction, there is a room which is currently closed. The entire temple is covered with carvings, notably 4 idols of Brahma, Vishnu and Saraswati above its entrance door. The pillar carvings show Vaishnavism, Shaivism and Shaktism related carvings. The larger temple ornamentation covers all the exterior walls and all surviving interior surfaces.

The twin temple, like elsewhere in India, has locally been called Sasbahu temple. The word Sasbahu means "mother-in-law, bride" or "a mother with her daughter-in-law", an association that implies their being together and interdependent. The Sas temple is typically the larger older temple of the twin. The Gwalior Sasbahu temple follows this style, but both temples are dedicated to Vishnu. Only the Sas temple has survived in some form, the Bahu temple is a shell structure of the original one storey with a highly ornate door frame and its defaced wall reliefs surviving. The remnants of the Bahu temple at Gwalior suggest that it may have been a smaller version of the Saas temple.

The Sas temple has a square sanctum attached to a rectangular two storey antarala and a closed three storey mandapa with three entrances. The temple main entrance porch has four carved Ruchaka ghatapallava-style pillars that are load-bearing. The walls and lintels are intricately carved, though much defaced. On the lintel of the entrances, friezes of Krishna-leela scenes are carved inside, while the outer side narrate legends from other Hindu texts. Above the lintel is Garuda, the vahana of Vishnu.

The Bahu temple also has a square sanctum with  side, with four central pillars. Its maha-mandapa is also a square with  side, with twelve pillars. The temple, like most Malwa and Rajputana historic temples, provides multiple entrances to the devotee. The roof consists of two rotated squares that intersect to form an octagon capped by successive overlapping circles. The pillars have octagonal bases as well, with girls carved but these have been defaced and mutilated. The sanctum has an image of damaged Vishnu, next to whom stands Brahma holding the Vedas on one side and Shiva holding the trident on the other side.

Gallery
Saas temple (bigger)

Bahu temple (smaller)

Artwork

See also
Siddhachal Caves
Telika Mandir

References

Bibliography

Dehejia, V. (1997). Indian Art. Phaidon: London. .

Harle, J.C., The Art and Architecture of the Indian Subcontinent, 2nd edn. 1994, Yale University Press Pelican History of Art,

External links
 

Buildings and structures in Gwalior
Temples in Madhya Pradesh
Tourist attractions in Gwalior